Barium carbide (also referred to as barium ethynediide or barium acetylide) is a chemical compound in the carbide family with the chemical formula BaC2.

Preparation 
Barium carbide can be synthesized as an impure compound by reducing barium carbonate powder with metallic magnesium in the presence of carbon-14. Carbon-14 containing barium carbide can also be made by reducing 14C carbon dioxide with hot barium metal at 600°C. These methods are used because of their high yield, and because the carbide is used to make acetylene. Carbon-14 is not something to turn into a waste product. It can also be prepared by heating a Barium amalgam and Carbon powder mixture in a Hydrogen current. The pure compound is prepared by reducing Barium oxide with Carbon at a high temperature.

Properties 
Barium carbide reacts similarly to calcium carbide, but it's more fusible. When exposed to extreme heat, the barium will evaporate leaving behind crystals of graphite. It can also absorb the carbon in a solution at high temperatures.

Hazards 
Barium carbide can cause damage to the GI tract and irritation in the skin and eyes.

References 

Barium compounds
Acetylides